Mocis paraguayica is a species of moth of the family Erebidae. It is found in Paraguay.

References

Moths described in 1913
Mocis
Moths of South America